Damiano Cima (born 13 September 1993 in Brescia) is an Italian cyclist, who currently rides for UCI ProTeam . His younger brother Imerio Cima is also a cyclist, and is also part of the  squad. In May 2019, he was named in the startlist for the 2019 Giro d'Italia, and won stage 18 of the race.

Major results

2014
 3rd Trofeo Edil C
2015
 7th GP Laguna
2016
 1st Gran Premio Industrie del Marmo
2017
 2nd La Popolarissima
2018
 1st  Overall Tour of Xingtai
1st Points classification
1st Stage 1
 2nd Overall Tour of China I
1st Stage 6
2019
 1st Stage 18 Giro d'Italia
 5th Coppa Bernocchi
2021
 3rd Overall Okolo Jižních Čech
1st Stage 4
 10th Clásica de Almería

Grand Tour general classification results timeline

References

External links

1993 births
Living people
Italian male cyclists
Italian Giro d'Italia stage winners
Cyclists from Brescia